General Atomics (GA) is an American energy and defense corporation headquartered in San Diego, California, specializing in research and technology development. This includes physics research in support of nuclear fission and nuclear fusion energy. The company also provides research and manufacturing services for remotely operated surveillance aircraft, including the Predator drones, airborne sensors, and advanced electric, electronic, wireless, and laser technologies.

History

General Atomics was founded on July 18, 1955, in San Diego, California, by Frederic de Hoffmann with assistance from notable physicists Edward Teller and Freeman Dyson. Originally the company was part of the General Atomic division of General Dynamics "for harnessing the power of nuclear technologies for the benefit of mankind".

GA's first offices were in the General Dynamics facility on Hancock Street in San Diego. GA also used a schoolhouse on San Diego's Barnard Street as its temporary headquarters, which it would later "adopt" as part of its Education Outreach program. In 1956, San Diego voters approved the transfer of land to GA for permanent facilities in Torrey Pines, and the John Jay Hopkins Laboratory for Pure and Applied Science was formally dedicated there on June 25, 1959. The Torrey Pines facility continues to serve as the company's headquarters today.

General Atomics's initial projects were the TRIGA nuclear research reactor, which was designed so that it was guaranteed to be safe by the laws of nature, and Project Orion.

GA helped develop and run the San Diego Supercomputer Center.

A brief history of the company:

 1967: Sold to Gulf Oil and renamed "Gulf General Atomic".
 1973: Renamed "General Atomic Company" when Royal Dutch Shell Group's Scallop Nuclear Inc. became a 50–50 partner.
 1979: Harold Agnew appointed president and CEO.
 1982: Renamed "GA Technologies Inc" when Gulf bought out its partner.
 1984: Taken ownership of by Chevron following its merger with Gulf Oil.
 1986: Sold to a company owned by Neal Blue and Linden Blue. Assumed its current name.
 1987: Joined by former US Navy Rear Admiral, Thomas J. Cassidy Jr.
 1993: Awarded the "Information Services" portion of the NSF contract for InterNIC functions and publishes Internet Scout Report.
 1993: Spawned General Atomics Aeronautical Systems, Inc. (GA-ASI), with Neal Blue as Chairman-CEO and Thomas J. Cassidy as president.
 1994: GA-ASI spun off as an affiliate.
 1995: Ended role as provider of InterNIC Information Services.

On March 15, 2010, Rear Adm. Thomas J. Cassidy stepped down as President of GA-ASI's Aircraft Systems Group, staying on as non-executive chairman of the company's management committee. Frank Pace, the executive vice president of Aircraft Systems Group, succeeded Cassidy as President of GA-ASI.

General Atomics is also developing a Generation IV reactor design, the Gas Turbine Modular Helium Reactor (GT-MHR). In 2010, General Atomics presented a new version of the GT-MHR, the Energy Multiplier Module (EM2), which uses fast neutrons and is a Gas-cooled fast reactor.

General Atomics, including its affiliate, General Atomics Aeronautical Systems, is San Diego County's largest defense contractor, according to a September 2013 report by the San Diego Military Affairs Council. The top five contractors, ranked by defense-generated revenue in fiscal year 2013, were General Atomics, followed by Northrop Grumman, General Dynamics-NASSCO, BAE Systems, and SAIC. A separate October 2013 report by the San Diego Business Journal ranked contractors by the number of local employees. The top three contractors were General Atomics, Northrop Grumman, and General Dynamics NASSCO.

In September 2020, a $7.4 billion contract for MQ-9 Reaper drones was announced between the U.S. Air Force and General Atomics. The contract calls for the delivery of up to 36 aircraft per year.

Leadership

In 2020, General Atomics Global Corporation appointed Indian-American defense industry veteran Vivek Lall as its new Chief Executive. This is Dr. Lall's second stint with the company as he has worked with General Atomics from August 2014 to December 2017 before joining Lockheed Martin.

Business groups
 Electromagnetic Systems Group
 The Electromagnetic Systems (EMS) Group is a supplier of electromagnetic systems and related power equipment for a variety of defense, energy, and commercial transportation applications. EMS has expertise in the design and fabrication of linear motors, superconducting and conventional rotating motors, power inverters, high-voltage DC power distribution systems, and numerous other energy conversion, distribution, and storage systems. EMS is a major factor in applying electromagnetic technologies to aircraft launch and recovery (EMALS and AAG System), projectile launch (Navy railgun), and magnetic levitation transportation systems.
 Nuclear Technology & Materials (NTM)
 Advanced fission reactor technology
 Nuclear fuels and medical isotopes
 Nuclear Materials Science & Engineering
Energy Group
Magnetic Fusion Energy
 DIII-D National Fusion Facility
 ITER Central Solenoid
 Fusion Plasma Theory and Computation
Inertial confinement fusion technology

Affiliated companies

 General Atomics Aeronautical Systems, Inc. (GA-ASI)GA-ASI's Aircraft Systems Group produces the Predator series of remotely piloted aircraft used in the Kosovo, Iraq, and Afghanistan conflicts. GA-ASI's Reconnaissance Systems Group provides tactical reconnaissance radars, as well as high-resolution surveillance systems for both manned and unmanned aircraft.
 General Atomics Electronic Systems, Inc. (GA-ESI)consists of five product lines involving different aspects of energy.
 Terminal Automation Products (TAP) provides automated distribution, inventory control and transaction processing systems to bulk product storage facilities that handle petroleum, chemical and agricultural products.
 Radiation Monitoring Systems (RMS) designs, manufactures, and supports a full range of radiation monitoring, detecting, control, data collection, and display equipment, with equipment and systems at over half of the currently operating nuclear plants in the United States and at numerous sites in Europe and throughout the Far East.
 General Atomics Energy Products manufactures Maxwell high voltage capacitors after acquiring the product line from Maxwell Technologies in 2000.
 The Gulftronic Separator System is a continuous operation, electrostatic, on-stream separation system currently in use by most major oil companies. Since their introduction in 1979, over 30 systems have been installed at petroleum refineries worldwide.
 TRIGA (Training, Research, Isotopes and General Atomics), with over 65 facilities in 22 countries, is a supplier of nuclear research reactors for university, industrial, government, and medical applications. Originally designed to meet requirements for operator training, educational programs including nuclear research, and fuel development, TRIGA's design has allowed its usage to be expanded to meet the requirements of application in medical and agricultural research, isotope production, and neutron radiography.
 General Atomics Systems Integration, LLC (GA-SI)provider of military and commercial engineering services. GA-SI is active in aircraft systems integration technologies, reliability improvements, and controls system design. GA-SI provides engineering services for new-development and aging-system services to military and commercial customers. The company also provides Test and Evaluation assessment as well as field services.
 ConverDynprovides uranium hexafluoride (UF6) conversion and related services to utilities operating nuclear power plants in North America, Europe, and Asia.  The company coordinates and manages all aspects of the conversion process, including uranium deliveries, uranium sampling, materials storage, and product delivery.  Jointly owned by Honeywell Inc.
 Cotter Corporationheadquartered in Denver, Colorado. Through its various mining and milling operations, Cotter has produced uranium, vanadium, molybdenum, silver, lead, zinc, copper, selenium, nickel, cobalt, tungsten, and limestone. Originally incorporated in 1956, in New Mexico as a uranium production company, Cotter was purchased by and became a wholly owned subsidiary of Commonwealth Edison in 1975. GA acquired Cotter in early 2000.
 Heathgate Resources Pty. Ltd.Formed in 1990, Heathgate Resources is the owner and operator of the Beverley Uranium Mine in northern South Australia. Beverley is Australia's third uranium mine and Australia's only operating In Situ Leach mine.
 Nuclear Fuels CorporationNFC was formed in 1991, by General Atomics (GA) to market uranium produced from GA mining assets as well as to develop additional uranium projects. NFC is a long-term contract supplier to both US and foreign utilities and actively participates in uranium trading. NFC is the marketing representative for other GA affiliates, Heathgate Resources and Cotter Corporation. The company also has an agreement to purchase all uranium recovered by Wismut GmbH from reclamation of the Königstein mine in eastern Germany.
 Rio Grande Resources Corporationcontrols uranium operations and mineral resources acquired by GA from Chevron Resources in 1991. Included in this acquisition were mines in south Texas and New Mexico. In New Mexico, the Mt. Taylor project, a conventional underground mine that contains the largest uranium resource in the United States, is currently on standby.
 TRIGA International (with CERCA, a subsidiary of Areva)
 Spezialtechnik Dresden GmbHSTD partners with General Atomics to market the Predator drone in Germany.

On 30 September 2020, General Atomics bought the Dornier 228 production line in Oberpfaffenhofen, along the business aviation and helicopter MRO operations of RUAG, pending regulatory approval.

Educational outreach
Since 1992, the General Atomics Science Education Outreach Program, a volunteer effort of GA employees and San Diego science teachers, has worked with Science Coordinators for the San Diego Schools to bring the business and research side of science into the classroom. The goal is both to improve the quality of science education and to encourage more students to pursue science careers. In addition, the teachers' interactions with the scientists and exposure to everyday uses of their disciplines help them to be better educators.

In 1995, the program was expanded, and the General Atomics Sciences Education Foundation [501(c) (3)] was established. The General Atomics Sciences Education Foundation's goal is to play a major role in enhancing pre-college education in science, engineering, and new technologies. To attain this goal, four areas of core competency at General Atomics were initially selected to form the basis for the development of inquiry-based education modules and associated workshops. Scientist/teacher teams wrote these modules, which fuse the content and methodology of industrial research and development with the teaching skills of experienced science teachers.

Awards
 2013 Neal Blue, CEO of General Atomics, receives the 29th Annual International von Karman Wings Award
 2008 North American Frost & Sullivan Award for Company of the Year
 2008 Defense News Top 100, Ranked #57
 Frost & Sullivan 2006 Business Development Strategy Leadership Award, presented for Gains in the Unmanned Aerial Systems Market
 Shephard Press' Unmanned Vehicles 2005 UAV Design Innovation Award, presented for Warrior Extended Range/Multi-Purpose UAV
 Aviation Week 2005 Employer of Choice Finalist, Diversity, Valuing People, Technological ChallengeThird Best US Aerospace/Defense Employer
 USAF Association 2004 John R. Alison Award for the most outstanding contributions to national defense by an industrial leader, presented to President/CEO, Thomas J. Cassidy Jr.
 AUVSI's 2002 Pioneer Award, presented to President/CEO Thomas J. Cassidy Jr.
 USAF's 2001 Packard Award for Development & Engineering, presented for Predator/Hellfire Integration

Government influence
Since 2005, the Center for Responsible Politics reported General Atomics had spent over $1.5 million per year in lobbying efforts from 2005 to 2011.

In April 2002, the company paid for Letitia White, who was then a top aide to Representative Jerry Lewis, and her husband to travel to Italy. White left Lewis' office nine months later, to become a lobbyist at Copeland Lowery. The next day, she began representing General Atomics. Lewis, her former boss, was at the time chairman of the House Defense Appropriations subcommittee.

See also
 Harold Agnew
 DIII-D (tokamak)
 HTGR
 Sequoyah Fuels Corporation
 Victorville Army Airfield auxiliary fields, including the General Atomics Mirage site and the General Atomics Grey Butte site

References

Bibliography

External links
 

Defense companies of the United States
Nuclear technology in the United States
Technology companies based in San Diego
American companies established in 1955
Technology companies established in 1955
1955 establishments in California
General Dynamics
Privately held companies based in California